William W. Bodine High School for International Affairs is an historic high school located in the Northern Liberties neighborhood of Philadelphia, Pennsylvania. It is part of the School District of Philadelphia.

History
The World Affairs Council and the school district cooperated in establishing the high school in 1981.

The school's building was designed by Irwin T. Catharine and built in 1924. It is a four-story, nine bay brick building on a raised basement in the Art Deco-style. It features an entrance portico with Doric order columns supporting an entablature.

It was added to the National Register of Historic Places in 1988 as the Thomas Jefferson School. The building and the school it previously housed were originally named for President Thomas Jefferson.

References

External links

 Bodine High School for International Affairs at Zaahah

School buildings on the National Register of Historic Places in Philadelphia
Art Deco architecture in Pennsylvania
School buildings completed in 1924
Northern Liberties, Philadelphia
High schools in Philadelphia
School District of Philadelphia
1981 establishments in Pennsylvania
Educational institutions established in 1981